Aiketgate is a small village in the English county of Cumbria.  It is within the civil parish of Hesket.

Development of wind turbines in the Eden Valley has drawn attention to Aiketgate. A company called Harmony Energy Ltd. has plans to erect a  mast at Barrock End Farm  in Aiketgate. These plans are opposed by the campaign group- NO2AWT.

References

External links

Villages in Cumbria
Eden District
Inglewood Forest